Louis Kamper (March 11, 1861 – February 24, 1953) was an American architect, active in and around Detroit and Wayne County, Michigan, in the United States.

Project range
In the early 20th century, with the major development of Detroit's Washington Boulevard launched by the Book brothers, Louis Kamper was called to redesign the street wall of the area. As a result, the boulevard is now lined with several Kamper-designed buildings: the Book Building (1916), the Washington Boulevard Building (1922–23), the Book-Cadillac Hotel (1924), the Book Tower (1926), and the Industrial Building (1928). Other downtown works include the Cadillac Square Building (1918), demolished in 1978, and the Water Board Building (1928), one of his finest skyscrapers.

His residential architectural projects include the Châteauesque style Col. Frank J. Hecker House in Detroit, and the Italian Renaissance Revival style Murray Sales House (1917) in Grosse Pointe, Michigan.

Louis Kamper styled the four architectural sculptures above the Michigan Avenue entrance to the Book-Cadillac Hotel which are, from left to right: Anthony Wayne, Antoine Cadillac, Chief Pontiac, and Robert Navarre.

Kamper-designed buildings
All buildings are located in Detroit, unless otherwise indicated.
Buildings designed by Louis Kamper include:

Col. Frank J. Hecker House, 1888-1892
Marvin M. Stanton Home ("The Castle"), 1898
Detroit International Fair and Exposition Building, 1889 (structure made entirely of wood)
Hugo Scherer summer home, 1898
Eighth Precinct Police Station, 1900–01
Frederick Chambe, 1897-1898
Frank J. Hecker, 1900
Bloomer and Nellie Gill House, Galion, Ohio, 1902-1903
Austin E. Morey, building permit issued 8/18/1903, finished 1904
Arthur E. Barker, building permit issued 12/14/1908, finished 1910
Cornelius Ray Mansion, building permit issued 11/12/1909, finished 1910
James Burgess Book Mansion, building permit issued 9/1/1910, finished 1911
George E Lawson Residence, building permit issued 10/9/1912, finished 1913
Herman Darmstaetter, 1913
Roseland Park Mausoleum, 1914
August P. Kling, building permit issued 12/9/1914, finished 1915
Frank B. Melin, 1915
Book Building, 1916
Murray Sales House, Grosse Pointe, Michigan, 1917
Kamper Residence, building permit issued 4/23/1915, finished 1917
C. Henry Haberkorn, 1917
Cadillac Square Building, 1918 (demolished, 1978)
Henry Wiegert, 1921
Kurt Kling, 1921
Clarence J. McLeod, 1922
Herbert V. Book Jr., 1921-1922
Louis N. Hilsendegen, 1922
Washington Boulevard Building, 1922–23
Carlton Plaza Hotel, 1923 (renovated into The Carlton Lofts)
Book-Cadillac Hotel, 1924 - four sculptures above the Michigan Avenue entrance
Park Avenue House, 1924 
Eddystone Building, 1924
Park Avenue Hotel, 1924 (demolished 2015)
Book Tower (adjacent to the Book Building), 1926
Consolidated Bank Building, 1926
Industrial Building, 1928
Water Board Building, 1928
David Broderick Tower (formerly the Eaton Tower), 1928
Higgins Elementary School, Detroit Public Schools, 1930
Sutton Residence, 1931 - 175 Merriweather, Grosse Pointe Farms, Michigan
Charles W. Kotcher House, 1914

Notes

References

Further reading

External links
Historic Detroit — Louis Kamper
Book Cadillac Hotel

American neoclassical architects
Gothic Revival architects
1861 births
1953 deaths
Architects from Detroit
German emigrants to the United States
20th-century American architects